Denson is a surname. Notable people with the surname include:

Abby Denson, American comic artist
Al Denson (American football), American footballer
Al Denson, American musician
Autry Denson, American footballer
Beasley Denson, Native American tribal chief
Brandon Denson, American football player
Damon Denson, American footballer
David Denson, American baseball player
Drew Denson, American baseball player
ED Denson, American record producer
G. Roger Denson, American art critic
Henry Denny Denson, Irish-born Canadian judge
Karl Denson, American musician
Kerry G. Denson, United States Army general
Moses Denson, American footballer
Rod Denson, American radio and television personality
Seaborn McDaniel Denson, American musician
Thomas Jackson Denson, American musician
Vin Denson, English cyclist
William D. Denson, American lawyer and military prosecutor
William Henry Denson, American politician
Willie Denson, American singer and songwriter

See also
Denson, Ohio, a community in the United States
Denson Devadas, Indian footballer
Denson Seamount, submarine volcano
Mount Denson, Nova Scotia, community in Nova Scotia, Canada